New York Township is one of twelve townships in Caldwell County, Missouri, and is part of the Kansas City metropolitan area with the USA.  As of the 2020 census, its population was 266.

Geography

The streams of Brush Creek, Cottonwood Creek, Crabapple Creek, Little Otter Creek, Otter Creek and Tom Creek run through this township.

References

External links
 US-Counties.com
 City-Data.com

Townships in Caldwell County, Missouri
Townships in Missouri